Alpine skiing at the 2019 European Youth Olympic Winter Festival was held from 11 to 15 February at Jahorina ski resort (slalom and giant slalom) and Bjelašnica (mixed team), Bosnia and Herzegovina.

Competition schedule

Course information

Medal summary

Medal table

Boys' events

Girls' events

Team event

References 

 
European Youth Olympic Winter Festival
2019
2019 European Youth Olympic Winter Festival events